"Road to the Riches" is the second single from American hip hop duo Kool G Rap & DJ Polo's 1989 debut album Road to the Riches. It was released as a single with "Butcher Shop" as a B-side and later also featured on the compilation albums Killer Kuts (1994), The Best of Cold Chillin (2000), Greatest Hits (2002) and Street Stories: The Best of Kool G Rap & DJ Polo (2013).

Background
The song is semi-autobiographic, rags-to-riches tale, with the first two verses detailing Kool G Rap's youth living in poverty and his life before becoming a successful rapper. The third and final verse warns of the dangers of living a life of crime. In a 2014 interview, G Rap stated that some parts of the song were true, such as him working a low-paying job in a Key Food supermarket and selling crack cocaine, while others, such as his father being a drug dealer, were fictional.

Music video
"Road to the Riches" was Kool G Rap & DJ Polo's first music video. The video begins with G Rap sitting with his young nephew on his lap, and the boy tells him, "Uncle G Rap, when I grow up, I want to be a rapper and a gangster, just like you". G Rap discourages him, however, saying "no, no, see, you can be a rapper but can't be a gangster. You don't want to be a gangster". The next scene is in media res and shows Kool G Rap & DJ Polo in a courtroom being sentenced by a judge. The rest of the video depicts them as powerful drug dealers, committing various violent crimes, before they are arrested in an undercover police sting and the video ends again with the courtroom scene, as they are led away to prison.

Use in media
The song was featured on the 2004 video game Grand Theft Auto: San Andreas' soundtrack, playing on the fictional old school hip hop station Playback FM.

Samples
"Road to the Riches" samples the following songs:
"The Assembly Line" by the Commodores
"Stiletto" by Billy Joel

And was later sampled on:
"Illegal Gunshot" by Ragga Twins
"Android" by The Prodigy
"Rotten Apple" by Operation Ratification
"Fool's Gold" by Zion I
"Pain the Town Red" by Children of the Corn

Track listing
A-side
 "Road to the Riches" (4:48)

B-side
 "Butcher Shop" (3:44)

Charts

References

External links
 "Road to the Riches" at Discogs

1988 singles
Kool G Rap songs
Songs written by Marley Marl
Songs written by Kool G Rap
Songs written by Billy Joel
Hardcore hip hop songs
Songs about crime
Songs about drugs
Songs about poverty
1988 songs
Song recordings produced by Marley Marl
Cold Chillin' Records singles
Warner Records singles